Pabellón de Hidalgo is a town of 4,006 inhabitants in the municipality of Rincón de Romos, Aguascalientes, Mexico.

It's said that after the defeat of the rebels at the Battle of Calderón Bridge, they arrived at the Hacienda de San Blas in Pabellón de Hidalgo, and removed Miguel Hidalgo y Costilla from command.

Museum of the Insurgency

The Museum of the Insurgency operates in what was formerly the Hacienda de San Blas. The museum opened on 17 October 1967 to commemorate events that took place during the independence of Mexico. It also houses murals by Alfredo Flores Zermeno, depicting cultural, political and social events of the last two centuries (1810-2010) in Mexico. 

The Museum is located on the western side of Plaza 24 de Enero Nº19. The Templo de San Blas en Pabellón de Hidalgo is located on the northern side of the plaza.

References

Populated places in Aguascalientes
January 1811 events